José David Toro Ruilova (June 24, 1898 – July 25, 1977) was a colonel in the Bolivian army and member of the High Command during the Chaco War (1932–35) who served as the de facto 35th president of Bolivia from 1936 to 1937. He was one of the leaders of the coup that deposed President Salamanca in November, 1934 and became President of the Republic in May 1936 as a result of a military uprising headed by his friend and comrade, Major Germán Busch.

Biography 
Installed in the Palacio Quemado, Toro immediately faced a number of pressing crises, not least of which were a massive federal deficit stemming from the war and continued economic dislocation associated with the ongoing Great Depression. More narrowly, he tackled a dispute with the Standard Oil Corporation, which had been at least not supportive enough of Bolivia during the war and at most, downright duplicitous and disloyal to the country. Apparently, a number of grave irregularities had been committed, including alleged smuggling of Bolivian oil to Argentina, Paraguay's most steadfast (if always under the table) supporter. In March 1937, the Toro government nationalized all Standard Oil holdings in Bolivia to the rejoicing of much of the population. This nationalization would prove to be the first step toward the statism that would characterize Bolivian politics in subsequent decades.

Moreover, the nationalization signaled the beginning of the end of the Oligarchic Republic, inaugurated in 1880 upon Bolivia's devastating loss to Chile in the War of the Pacific. This was a period of civilian control of Bolivian politics and little intervention of the army in the political process, except on brief occasions and always either on behalf of a civilian caudillo or in order to call elections. The Chaco War, however, had changed everything. Tens of thousands of Bolivian Indians had been conscripted to fight in the war and had made major sacrifices on behalf of a government that discriminated against them and barred them any meaningful participation in national affairs. Coincidentally, the 1930s had witnessed the onset of much political ferment throughout the world, and Bolivia was not completely at the margin of those trends. During the turbulent, crisis-racked decade, a number of Communist, Stalinist, Trotskyist, anarchist, and reformist parties had been created, and new currents of thought began to call for major changes in Bolivian society. Toro and the young officers who had installed him called their experiment "Military Socialism," but, fearful of the still considerable power of the economic elites, failed to go far enough with their reforms. Still, an important new Worker's Law was unveiled, spelling a wider set of rights for working men and women.

In the end, Toro was caught between the cross currents of reformers from the left, and the interests of a mining magnatate. On 13 July 1937, Toro resigned the presidency and Lieutenant Colonel Germán Busch assumed the presidency. Toro attempted to dislodge Busch from power a year after his ouster, but his coup attempt failed and he sought exile in Chile, where he died on 25 July 1977, at the age of 79.

See also 
 Cabinet of David Toro

References

Notes

Sources 
Querejazu Calvo, Roberto. "Masamaclay."
Farcau, Bruce W. "The Chaco War: Bolivia and Paraguay, 1932-1935."
Mesa José de; Gisbert, Teresa; and Carlos D. Mesa, "Historia De Bolivia."

1898 births
1977 deaths
20th-century Bolivian politicians
Bolivian expatriates in Chile
Bolivian military personnel
Government ministers of Bolivia
Leaders ousted by a coup
Leaders who took power by coup
Interior ministers of Bolivia
People from Sucre
People of the Chaco War
Presidents of Bolivia
Justice ministers of Bolivia